Cnemaspis silvula is a species of diurnal gecko endemic to island of Sri Lanka.

References

 http://reptile-database.reptarium.cz/species?genus=Cnemaspis&species=silvula
 https://web.archive.org/web/20141004183323/http://www.srilankanreptiles.com/TetrapodReptiles/Gekkonidae.html
 http://biodiversityofsrilanka.blogspot.com/2011/01/forest-daygecko-cnemaspis-silvula.html

silvula
Reptiles of Sri Lanka
Reptiles described in 2007